Solovyovo, formerly Taipale, is a rural locality (a settlement) in Priozersky District of Leningrad Oblast, Russia, located on the western shore of Lake Ladoga on the Karelian Isthmus about  north of Saint Petersburg. Vuoksi River's southern armlet Burnaya empties into Lake Ladoga at Solovyovo. As of January 1997, its population was 7.

History
The area was held by the Finnish forces until the end of that war, when all of the Karelian Isthmus was ceded to the Soviet Union and had to be evacuated in haste.

References

Notes

Sources
В.Г. Кожевников (V.G. Kozhevnikov). "Административно-территориальное деление Ленинградской области" (Administrative-Territorial Structure of Leningrad Oblast), 1997. .

Rural localities in Leningrad Oblast
Winter War
History of the Karelian Isthmus
